Michael Puscar is an entrepreneur and venture capitalist. Puscar has founded several companies including Yuxi Pacific, GITP Ventures, Miguelo Romano, Oiga Technologies and NPCx, among others. He is a published data scientist and part of the business community changing the economy in Medellin, Colombia. 

In 2013, Michael Puscar was a passenger on an Alitalia flight when it crash-landed at Leonardo da Vinci–Fiumicino Airport in Rome, Italy. Puscar captured video of the crash from his seat on the plane, and this video was distributed in several major media outlets.

In 2020, Puscar revisited the crash in an episode of Brains Byte Back with Sam Brake. In the podcast, Puscar stated that he thought he was going to die and that the event significantly impacted his outlook on life.

Business ventures

Yuxi Pacific
In 2005, Puscar launched Yuxi Pacific, a professional services firm founded in Philadelphia, Pennsylvania and focused on the creation of digital products for the publishing industry. In 2011, Puscar brought Yuxi Pacific to Medellin, Colombia. By 2013, the company had more than 100 employees in Medellín and had quadrupled its annual revenues.

Puscar has been dubbed a hero in the "Medellin Miracle," a transformation in which the city changes its reputation from the land of violent drug cartels to a modern metropolis. While Puscar supports government backing, he believes private initiatives will ultimately lead to the rebranding of Colombia. Puscar has written about the Colombian economy. Puscar has given back to the community, donating computers to local Colombian schools.

Yuxi Pacific was acquired by Blue Loop Capital in June 2013 for an undisclosed amount of cash.

GITP Ventures
Following the acquisition of Yuxi Pacific, Puscar founded GITP Ventures, a venture capital firm based in South America. Through GITP, Puscar invested in more than 6 Colombian companies, including "Colombia Focus", "Publicize", and "IPSUM Clinical", among others. The first investment made by GITP was in software company Lex Paradigm. The company was acquired less than two years later in January 2014.

Miguelo Romano
In 2014, Puscar co-founded Miguelo Romano, the world's first and only provider of blade and bullet resistant consumer clothing that is lightweight. Puscar was interviewed by Vice Media regarding the company.

Other Ventures
In 2017, Puscar launched Oiga Technologies. Oiga is a professional services firm focused upon emerging technology. In 2020, Puscar co-founded and invested in NPCx, a software company using artificial intelligence to create more realistic 3D animation in video games.

Personal life
Puscar is the son of Michael and Paula Puscar. His father, Michael Puscar Sr, was a laborer and machinist. Puscar Sr. died in September 2007.

In 2015, Puscar married Johana Buriticá, a fashion blogger from San Luis, Colombia.

References

Living people
Italian businesspeople
Italian philanthropists
Temple University alumni
Venture capitalists
Year of birth missing (living people)